John Morneau (born 1926) is a retired Canadian football player who played for the Ottawa Rough Riders. He won the Grey Cup with them in 1951. He previously attended and played football at Assumption College in Windsor, Ontario.

References

1926 births
Sportspeople from Windsor, Ontario
Players of Canadian football from Ontario
Ottawa Rough Riders players
Living people